is a railway station in the city of Nishio, Aichi Prefecture, Japan, operated by Meitetsu.

Lines

Station layout
The station has a single island platform connected to the station building by a level crossing. The station has automated ticket machines, Manaca automated turnstiles and is unattended.

Platforms

Adjacent stations

|-
!colspan=5|Nagoya Railroad

Station history
Nishi Hazu Station was opened on July 24, 1936. It has been unattended since February 1985.

Passenger statistics
In fiscal 2017, the station was used by an average of 315 passengers daily (boarding passengers only).

Surrounding area
Japan National Route 247
former Hazu Town Hall

See also
 List of Railway Stations in Japan

References

External links

 Official web page

Railway stations in Japan opened in 1936
Railway stations in Aichi Prefecture
Stations of Nagoya Railroad
Nishio, Aichi